Priya R. Pai is a Carnatic vocalist, composer and playback singer. She is the host of musical TV show Layatharang on Kairali we channel. She is famous for Karnatic-western fusion music and has released five albums. On the album Harshamo Dukhamo she sang poems by former minister Binoy Viswam. She also sings and composes devotional and Classical songs.

She has more than 1000 recorded songs in various Indian languages including Malayalam, Tamil, Telugu, Kannada, Sanskrit, Hindi, Konkani, and Marathi.She is conducting a music school 'Saveri School of Music' where she trains more than 200 students. She is the recipient of Senior Scholarship from Human Resources Development by the Central Government of India and an accreditation award for Carnatic Music from Kalady Sree Sankara School of Music and Dance. She has composed and sung in more than 30 classical fusion albums. She was the host of Musical TV show 'Laya Tharang' in Kairali we channel. She has been rendering Narayaneeyam and Bhaagavatham in the program 'Sandhya Deepam' in Amrita Channel for the past 6 years. And also she was the host for the program 'Sangamam' in Jeevan TV. She has sung the title song for the famous TV show in Amrita Channel 'Kadhayallithu Jeevitham'.

Early life
Born in Idukki District, Kerala into a family of musicians, Priya' s father, was a Mridangist. Her younger sister Praveena is also a singer. She did her studies in Trivandrum in Cotton Hills GHS, NSS College, Mar Ivanios College, and Women's College Tvm. She is a double degree holder of both Maths and Music and also she did her PG in Music. Priya received her training in Carnatic Music from Valiyammal also known as Pattu Maami who lived at Karamana. She also learned music from Sree Varkala C.S Jayaram and Sree N.P Ramaswamy. She was selected for the National talent search scholarship from the Central Government from 1988 to 1992.

Personal life
Priya R Pai is married to Remesh Pai VP. They have 2 daughters, Shradha R Pai and Shreya R Pai who are also singers.

Music school
In 2004, Priya R Pai established a music school 'Saveri School of Music' at Edappally, Ernakulam and now it has 2 more branches at Thevakkal, Ernakulam and Bengaluru where more than 200 students are learning classical music.

Albums
 Bhava Tarang
 Manasa Sancharare
 Kishna Nee Begane Baro
 Kriti Malika
 Vishnu Sahasranamam
 Lalitha Sahasranamam
 Om Bhavani
 Soundaryalahari
 Mahadeva Shiva Shambho
 Raga Sudharasa
 Unnai Adainthen
 Thillana
 Harshamo Dukkhamo
 Pancharatna Kritis
 Adathu Asangathu Vaa Kanna
 Coffee at MG Road
 Slokamalika

Performances
 Soorya Festival- Performed at Soorya Festival (Soorya Ramayanotsav) 
 Sangeetha Nataka Academy- Concert at Thrissur, Palakkad and 
 National Museum, Delhi-Performed at National Museum Janapat Road conducted by the Central Government of India. 
 Chembai Sangeetholsavam, Guruvayur

Films
 Anchil Oral Arjunan – Sukrutham Sudha Mayam (music by Mohan sithara)
 Kaazhcha – Dup Dup Janaki
Ozhimuri – Brova Baramma ( Classical Composition).

TV shows
 Layatharang – Kairali WE
 Sandhyadeepam – Amrita TV
 KadhayallithuJeevitham- Amrita TV
 Sangamam- Jeevan TV
 Aalap'' – Asianet News

References 

Living people
Women Carnatic singers
Carnatic singers
Indian women composers
20th-century Indian composers
20th-century Indian women singers
20th-century Indian singers
1976 births
20th-century women composers